Extreme Paranormal is an American paranormal documentary TV special that premiered on Monday, October 26, 2009, on A&E Network at 10pm EST. It aired as a two-part 1 hour special for Halloween and followed the missions of three paranormal investigators that go to extremes in order to make contact with spirits during their investigations.

Premise
In Extreme Paranormal, paranormal investigators, Shaun, Nathan, and Jason explore local legends, seeking the truth by provoking spirits and recreating tragedies during their investigations. Unlike other paranormal groups, this extreme team puts themselves in harm's way with their aggressive tactics by taunting ghosts, summoning the dead, performing rituals, challenging curses, and daring demons to attack them.

Opening: (narrator: Shaun): "Every town has a legend, a haunting, its own portal to hell. We knock on the door and say, "What's up?" (Show Yourself.) "Can the devil come out and play?" We're not your typical paranormal investigators. We set up experiments to provoke spirits. And we won't back down until we make contact. You can't take the heat. Stay out of hell."

Warning: "The views on the occult and the supernatural documented in this show are those of the investigators. Portions of the rituals in this episode have been omitted for your protection. Do not try this at home!"

Team Members
The team's plan is the same as always: "find the center of paranormal activity and keep cranking up the pressure until the spirit shows himself."  They're known for provoking spirits and recreating the scenes a person might have walked through before their death. They have 10 years of experience in hunting demons and ghosts across America. Every night at midnight, they recount their latest adventures on their popular radio show, Ghostman and Demon Hunter.

Shaun Burris - Lead Investigator. Narrator, researches history of haunted locations. Co-host of Ghost Man and Demon Hunter Radio Show.
Nathan Schoonover - Occult Specialist. Performs different types of rituals during investigations. Co-host of Ghost Man and Demon Hunter Radio Show. (Was also featured on an episode of Paranormal Challenge competing with his paranormal team, New Jersey Ghost Hunters Society.)
Jason Gowin - Tech Expert. Handles all the equipment and builds special devices for cases.
Tom Maat (additional member for specialized cases) - Empathic shaman. An empath who is able to focus his energies and help paranormal investigators find where the spirits are located. He can sense and feel things from people, spirits around them, and even from the energy in the walls of buildings. He pinpoints the locations of where the most activity is in a place.

Equipment:
Parabolic microphone, night-vision camera, EMF meter, K-2 meter, digital audio recorder, thermal camera, and walkie-talkies.

Episode List

Season One (2009)

References

External links

Paranormal television
2000s American television specials
2009 television specials